Alistair Alcock (born 20 July 1972) is a New Zealand cricketer. He played in 9 first-class and 31 List A matches for Central Districts from 1992 to 1997.

See also
 List of Central Districts representative cricketers

References

External links
 

1972 births
Living people
New Zealand cricketers
Central Districts cricketers
Cricketers from Napier, New Zealand